The W.D. & H.O. Wills Tournament was a professional golf tournament on the British PGA tournament circuit from 1968 to 1974. Since the circuit later evolved into the European Tour, the tournament is recognised as an official European Tour event from 1972. The sponsor was tobacco company W.D. & H.O. Wills.

Winners

References

External links
Coverage on European Tour's official site
Results at where2golf.com

Former European Tour events
Golf tournaments in the United Kingdom
Recurring sporting events established in 1968
Recurring events disestablished in 1974
1968 establishments in England
1974 disestablishments in England
Defunct sports competitions in the United Kingdom